Sarah Beth Grey and Olivia Nicholls were the defending champions, but chose not to participate.

Arina Rodionova and Yanina Wickmayer won the title, defeating Freya Christie and Valeria Savinykh in the final, 6–2, 7–5.

Seeds

Draw

Draw

References
Main Draw

GB Pro-Series Shrewsbury - Doubles